Panka may refer to:

 Mindaugas Panka (born 1984), Lithuanian footballer
 Panka, Ukraine, a village in Ukraine
 Panka prabha, in Jainism, the hell of mud, see Naraka (Jainism)
 Páⁿka, the name the Ponca, a Native American tribe of the Siouan-language group, call themselves
 *pank'a, in Persian units of measurement, one pace, approximately 1.5 meters (5 feet)
 Pankha, Hindu for the punkah, a type of fan
 Alternative spelling for the Panika, community of India
 Panka (cicada), a genus of cicadas

See also
 Pankaj, given name